Mongolia competed at the 1976 Summer Olympics in Montreal, Quebec, Canada.

Results by event

Archery
In the second time they competed in archery at the Olympics, Mongolia entered two men and two women.  Their highest placing competitor was again Natjav Dariimaa, this time at 22nd place in the women's competition.  Dariimaa was the only Olympic veteran for Mongolia in 1976.

Women's Individual Competition:
 Natjav Dariimaa — 2209 points (→ 22nd place)
 Gombosure Enkhtaivan — 2156 points (→ 24th place)

Men's Individual Competition:
 Niamtseren Biambasuren — 2256 points (→ 28th place)
 Tserendorjin Dagvadorj — 2179 points (→ 32nd place)

Boxing
Men's Light Flyweight (– 48 kg)
 Serdamba Batsuk
 First Round — Defeated Enrique Rodríguez (ESP), RSC-3
 Second Round — Lost to György Gedó (HUN), 0:5

Wrestling
Men's Freestyle (– 62 kg)
 Zevegiin Oidov — Won the silver medal.

References
Official Olympic Reports
International Olympic Committee results database

Nations at the 1976 Summer Olympics
1976 Summer Olympics
Oly